is a passenger railway station located in the city of Hannō, Saitama, Japan, operated by the private railway operator Seibu Railway.

Lines

Station layout
This station consists of a single island platform serving two tracks, connected to the station building by a level crossing.

History
The station opened on 10 September 1929. A new station building was completed on 24 August 1997.

Station numbering was introduced on all Seibu Railway lines during fiscal 2012, with Agano Station becoming "SI31".

Passenger statistics
In fiscal 2019, the station was the 87th busiest on the Seibu network with an average of 617 passengers daily. The passenger figures for previous years are as shown below.

Surrounding area
 Komagawa River
 
 Agano Post Office
 Chichibu Ontake Shrine

See also
 List of railway stations in Japan

References

External links

 Seibu Railway station information 

Railway stations in Saitama Prefecture
Railway stations in Japan opened in 1929
Seibu Ikebukuro Line
Stations of Seibu Railway
Hannō